Samy Boutouil (born 3 October 2000) is a Moroccan swimmer. He competed in the men's 100 metre freestyle at the 2020 Summer Olympics.

References

External links
 

2000 births
Living people
Moroccan male swimmers
Moroccan male freestyle swimmers
Olympic swimmers of Morocco
Swimmers at the 2018 Summer Youth Olympics
Swimmers at the 2020 Summer Olympics
Place of birth missing (living people)
African Games medalists in swimming
21st-century Moroccan people
African Games bronze medalists for Morocco
Competitors at the 2019 African Games